Igor Čagalj (born 6 October 1982) is a retired Bosnian-born Croatian football defender who last played for NK Ravnice.

Statistics

Club

Honours
Gorica
Druga HNL: 2017-18

References

External links

1982 births
Living people
People from Doboj
Association football defenders
Croatian footballers
Croatia youth international footballers
HNK Segesta players
NK Hrvatski Dragovoljac players
NK Inter Zaprešić players
HNK Šibenik players
HNK Rijeka players
NK Istra 1961 players
HNK Gorica players
NK Vinogradar players
First Football League (Croatia) players
Croatian Football League players
Slovenian PrvaLiga players
Second Football League (Croatia) players
Croatian expatriate footballers
Expatriate footballers in Slovenia
Croatian expatriate sportspeople in Slovenia